Raúl Llanos (born 23 January 1949) is a Cuban former sports shooter. He competed at the 1968 Summer Olympics and the 1972 Summer Olympics.

References

External links
 

1949 births
Living people
Cuban male sport shooters
Olympic shooters of Cuba
Shooters at the 1968 Summer Olympics
Shooters at the 1972 Summer Olympics
Sportspeople from Havana
20th-century Cuban people